The Kozje-Bizeljsko dialect (kozjansko-bizeljsko narečje), also known as the Brežice-Kozje dialect (brežiško-kozjansko narečje) or the Bizeljsko-Sotla dialect (bizeljsko-obsoteljsko narečje) is a Slovene dialect in the Styrian dialect group. It extends north of the Sava River at Brežice, ranging from Jurklošter to Podčetrtek in the north, encompassing the settlements of Kozje and Bizeljsko, and to the Sotla River in the east. It is the southernmost dialect in the Styrian dialect group.

Phonological and morphological characteristics
The Kozje-Bizeljsko dialect has transitional features to the Lower Carniolan dialects such as an originally preserved semivowel with a positionally conditioned a reflex of the long semivowel, and retention of pitch accent. The former acute accent is bimoraic, the circumflex is monomoraic, and original quantitative distinctions between vowels have largely been replaced by qualitative differences. It is characterized by the phonemic developments a > ɔ, u > ü, unaccented u, ə, and yat > i, and lowering of high vowels before r.

References

Slovene dialects in Styria (Slovenia)